Acacia desertorum is a shrub belonging to the genus Acacia and the subgenus Juliflorae that is endemic to western Australia.

Description
It has sericeous, ribbed, glabrous branchlets. The grey-green ascending phyllodes are straight to shallowly incurved with a rhombic-terete shape. The simple inflorescences occur singly or in pairs in the axils.

Taxonomy
The species was first formally described by the botanists Joseph Maiden and William Blakley in 1927 as part of the work Descriptions of fifty new species and six varieties of western and northern Australian Acacias, and notes on four other species as published in the Journal of the Royal Society of Western Australia. It was reclassified as Racosperma desertorum in 2003 by Leslie Pedley and then transferred back to genus Acacia in 2006.

There are two varieties:
 Acacia desertorum Maiden & Blakely var. desertorum
 Acacia desertorum var. nudipes R.S.Cowan & Maslin.

Distribution
It is native to an area in the Goldfields-Esperance region of Western Australia where it is found on sand dunes, sandplains and flats growing in gravelly and sandy soils over laterite. It has a scattered and disjunct distribution from around Southern Cross in the west to the Great Victoria Desert in the east.

See also
List of Acacia species

References

desertorum
Acacias of Western Australia
Plants described in 1927
Taxa named by Joseph Maiden
Taxa named by William Blakely